"Miss Me" is a song by Swedish-Congolese singer-songwriter Mohombi featuring vocals from Grammy Award-winning American recording artist, actor and entrepreneur Nelly from his debut album MoveMeant. It was released on 28 October 2010 as a Digital download in the United Kingdom. RedOne, AJ Junior, Mohombi, Ilya, Cornell Haynes Jr. and was produced by RedOne. It peaked at number 66 on the UK Singles Chart.

Music video
A music video to accompany the release of "Miss Me" was first released onto YouTube on 1 February 2011 at a total length of four minutes and sixteen seconds.

Track listing

Chart performance

Release history

References

External links
 Official website

2010 singles
Mohombi songs
Song recordings produced by RedOne
Songs written by RedOne
Island Records singles
Song recordings produced by Ilya Salmanzadeh
Songs written by Ilya Salmanzadeh
Songs written by AJ Junior
2010 songs
Songs written by Nelly
Songs written by Mohombi